The 1887 Harvard Crimson football team represented Harvard University in the 1887 college football season. They finished with a 10–1 record. In the first 10 games of the season, the Crimson outscored opponents 652 to 6.  The sole loss came in the final game on November 24, 1887, a 17-8 loss against Yale in New York, New York.

Schedule

References

Harvard
Harvard Crimson football seasons
Harvard Crimson football